"The Replacement" is episode three of season five of the television show Buffy the Vampire Slayer.

Plot
The gang starts looking for an apartment for Xander so he can move out of his parents' house, though he worries that he may not be able to afford it, upsetting Anya. Giles receives a visit from a demon searching for the Slayer. He later identifies the demon as Toth, the only survivor of the Tothric Clan. The gang checks out the city dump in search of the demon and finds Spike scavenging. The demon hits Xander with light from a rod and knocks him to the ground. He gets to his feet and walks off with the rest of the gang, while there is another Xander still lying in a pile of trash.

The next morning, one Xander awakens at the city dump and then discovers his double upon returning to his house. One of the Xanders is very ambitious and gets a promotion at work, signs a lease for the apartment, and sets up a date with Anya. The unconfident Xander watches as all this happens and finally confronts his double. After the two Xanders see each other, the confident Xander talks to Buffy and she makes this a matter of Slayer business. Soaked by the rain, weak Xander goes to Willow and tries to explain that this double is taking over his life; he then suddenly realizes that his double is going after Anya.

Anya and the confident Xander discuss their future and Anya expresses her fears about not living forever. Giles discovers that the rod Toth used on Xander split him into two Xanders – one with weak qualities and the other with strong qualities. Toph intended to use the rod to split Buffy into two beings. In addition, as the two beings are real and technically one being, the death of one will kill them both. The weak Xander crashes the date between strong Xander and Anya. Both think that the other is a demon and the weak Xander pulls out a handgun he got from Anya's apartment.

Buffy tells the doubles the truth about their situation and tries to convince them not to kill each other. When Toth appears at the apartment, Buffy and Riley fight and kill him. The two Xanders eventually begin to get along, and Willow ends the spell on the Xanders, making them one again. While moving Xander into his new apartment, Xander and Riley talk. Riley confesses that, despite how much he loves Buffy, he realizes that she does not feel the same.

References

External links
 
 "The Replacement" at BuffyGuide.com.

Buffy the Vampire Slayer (season 5) episodes
2000 American television episodes
Television episodes written by Jane Espenson